Mount Lofty, a peak in the Mount Lofty Ranges near Adelaide in South Australia.

Mount Lofty may also refer to:

Australia

South Australia
Mount Lofty Botanic Garden
Mount Lofty Fire Tower
Mount Lofty railway station
Mount Lofty Ranges, the mountain range that includes Mount Lofty
Mount Lofty Ranges zone (wine), a wine zone

Queensland
 Mount Lofty, Queensland, an inner suburb of Toowoomba
 Mount Lofty, a peak on the eastern edge of the Great Dividing Range in southeast Queensland

See also
Lofty (disambiguation)